Anton Apriantono (born Serang, Banten; October 5, 1959) is an Indonesian academician who was Indonesia's Minister of Agriculture between October 2004 and October 2009. He studied at the University of Reading and currently is a faculty in Department of Food Science and Technology at Bogor Agricultural University.

Apriantono is also the President commissioner of Tiga Pilar.

References

External links
Profile at TokohIndonesia.com

1959 births
Living people
Alumni of the University of Reading
Agriculture ministers of Indonesia
Bogor Agricultural University alumni